Stanislav Volodymyrovych Aseyev (also Stanyslav Asieiev, Stanislav Vasin ; born October 1, 1989) is a Ukrainian writer and journalist, founder Justice Initiative Fund. His best known work is the novel The Melchior Elephant (2016). In May 2014 his native city of Donetsk fell under control of pro-Russian militants and he remained there. During the period of 2015–2017 Aseyev was publishing his reports (writing under the pen name Stanislav Vasin) for Mirror Weekly newspaper and other Ukrainian media, before 2 June 2017, when he disappeared. On 16 July, an agent of the DNR's “Ministry of State Security” confirmed that he was kidnapped by militants from Donetsk People's Republic.

Despite huge international support Aseyev was sentenced for 15 years and spent 962 days in Izolyatsia prison. He was released as part of a prison exchange and handed over to Ukrainian authorities on 29 December 2019.

Biography 
Aseyev born in Donetsk in 1989. In 2006 he graduated from secondary school in the town of Makiivka and started courses at the Institute of Informatics and Artificial Intelligence of Donetsk National Technical University. There he earned a master's degree in Religious Studies with Honors in 2012.

His philosophical interests include 20th-century French and German ontology.

According to a biography published in Yunost magazine, after attending university Aseyev travelled to Paris, where he applied for service in the French Foreign Legion, then came back to Ukraine and tried many professions such as loader, intern at a bank, grave digger, operator in a mailing company, and shop assistant.

Journalism in Donetsk 
Aseyev has stayed in Donetsk since it was captured by pro-Russian militants in 2014. He describes the war in Donbass and his life under occupation in his novel and journalistic reports.

Aseyev used the pseudonym Stanislav Vasin to report from territories occupied by the Russian military and pro-Russian militants. The reason was widespread persecutions by the Ministry of State Security and different militants’ groups of the self-proclaimed Donetsk People's Republic. Aseyev's position wasn't clearly pro-Ukrainian (he was often accused by commentators of "a lack of patriotism" or "immaturity of political views"). His reports exposing crimes in the self-proclaimed Donetsk People's Republic consisted of reports of war crimes of the Republic's militants, Russian activities in Donbass, and pro-Ukrainian resistance.

In 2015 his reports were published by Ukrayinska Pravda. Between 2016 and 2017 he was a correspondent of the Mirror Weekly, a notable Ukrainian newspaper where he published 14 articles. Also in 2016 — 2017 he wrote about 50 articles and photo-reports for the US government outlet Radio Liberty.

Kidnapping 
His last report was for RFE/RL's project Donbass Realities, sent on June 2, 2017 (disputable if it was really written by him or, maybe, under pressure of kidnappers). His Facebook page was active for a while but probably managed by another person.

Aseyev's mother (living in Makiivka near Donetsk) visited his apartment and witnessed traces of illegal enter and search there.

His fellow student and former MP Yehor Firsov reported Aseyev's disappearance on June 6 blaming Russia-backed militants of kidnapping. Later this fact was commented by Security Service of Ukraine, UN Monitoring Mission on Human Rights to Ukraine, Ukraine Journalists Union.

On July 16, 2017, an agent of the DNR's “Ministry of State Security” confirmed to Aseyev's mother that her son was in their custody and that he is suspected of "espionage". Independent media is not allowed to report from the "DNR"-controlled territory.

In July 2018, Aseyev reportedly began a hunger strike while being imprisoned.

In October 2019 the Supreme Court of the DPR found Aseyev guilty in charges of organizing an extremist community, espionage and incitement to espionage, and public actions aimed at violating territorial integrity, he was sentenced to 15 years in prison. #FreeAseyev an international campaign for journalist's release supported by authorities, professional communities and human rights activists was active since 2017 to 2019. Last events of the campaign were held few weeks before his release, November 15, 2019. People gathered on "Empty chair day" in Kyiv, Lviv, Kramatorsk, New York, Rome and London.

Amnesty International, Committee to Protect Journalists, the European Federation of Journalists, Human Rights Watch, the Norwegian Helsinki Committee, the Organization for Security and Co-operation in Europe, PEN International, Reporters Without Borders and the United States Mission to the Organization for Security and Cooperation in Europe have called for his immediate release. The US Senators Bob Menendez and Marco Rubio have also voiced their support for Aseyev.

Stas Aseyev and his less-known colleague Oleh Halaziuk were released (as part of a controversial prison exchange between the Donetsk People's Republic, the Luhansk People's Republic and Ukraine) and handed over to Ukrainian authorities on 29 December 2019.

Political activity 
After his release, Aseyev took an active social and political position, dealing with the rights of captives of illegal prisons in Russia and on occupied territories. On January 29, 2020, Aseyev delivered a speech at the Council of Europe in which he asked the member states to put pressure on Russia to release the captives. On February 15, 2020, the journalist spoke at the Munich Security Conference, where he spoke about the inhumane treatment of captives by militants. On February 14, 2020, Aseyev met with a group of US senators at Radio Liberty's Prague office to discuss the release of the remaining captives in the occupied territories of Donetsk region.

Literature 
Before his illegal capture and imprisonment, Aseyev published a work of prose—the autobiographical novel The Melchior Elephant, or A Man Who Thought (in Russian). It was published for the first time in Moscow in Yunost magazine (#1 — #6, 2015) and in the next year it came out in hardback in publishing house Kayala in Kyiv. According to Yunost's editor Yevgeniy Malevich: «his perspective is not a journalist-like, nor a writer-like but he's the young philosopher. In his novel Stanislav turns himself inside out, showing the world of a small town and the war that tore the country in half».

While remaining in his native Donbas region from the beginning of Russia-sponsored hostilities there, Aseyev contributed short dispatches on the situation on the ground to prominent Ukrainian and international media, writing under the pen name of Vasin. A book of collected dispatches entitled In Isolation (in Ukrainian and Russian) appeared while he was still in captivity.

Following his release, Aseyev published an autobiographical work entitled The Torture Camp on Paradise Street (in Ukrainian), describing his time in the illegal prison Izoliatsia and the mistreatment and torture prisoners experienced there at the hands of the Russian-controlled administration.

Awards 
 Free Media Awards 2020
 National Freedom of Expression Award 2020
 Taras Shevchenko National Prize (Shevchenko Award) 2021

Works 
 Шестой день: сб. поэм, рассказов и стихов / Станислав Владимирович Асеев. — Донецк: Норд-Пресс, 2011. — 207 с. —  
 Андерхилльские ведьмы: драма: в 2 ч. Проза / Станислав Владимирович Асеев. — Донецк: Донбасс, 2011. — 228 с. —  
 Мельхиоровый слон, или Человек, который думал: Роман-автобиография / С. Асеев // Юность. — 2015. — No. 1—6.
 Мельхиоровый слон, или Человек, который думал: роман-автобиография / Станислав Асеев. — Киев : Каяла, 2016. — 267 с. —  
 В ізоляції / Станіслав Асєєв, тексти, фото; передм. Мар'яни Драч, Сергія Рахманіна, Дмитра Крапивенка; ілюстр. Сергія Захарова // К.: Люта справа, 2018. — 208 с. — 
 In Isolation: Dispatches from Occupied Donbas (2022) translated by Lidia Wolanskyj. Cambridge: Harvard Ukrainian Research Institute.  
 
 
 The Torture Camp on Paradise Street, (2022) translated by Zenia Tompkins and Nina Murray. Cambridge, Mass.: Harvard Ukrainian Research Institute.  (hardcover)

References

External links 
 Stanislav's author page on Mirror Weekly web-site
 list of Stanislav's publications on RFE/RL and editorial message about the disappearance of journalist
 the first interview after 

1989 births
2010s missing person cases
Living people
Donetsk National Technical University alumni
Free Media Awards winners
Formerly missing people
Hunger strikers
Writers from Donetsk
People from Makiivka
People of the 2014 pro-Russian unrest in Ukraine
Pro-Ukrainian people of the war in Donbas
Ukrainian bloggers
Ukrainian journalists
Ukrainian people taken hostage
Ukrainian prisoners and detainees
Ukrainian victims of human rights abuses
Ukrainian torture victims